Edson Riquelme (born 29 August 1985) is a Chilean former footballer. His last club was Lota Schwager.

He played for Chile Under-20 in the 2005 South American Youth Championship in Colombia and the 2005 FIFA World Youth Championship in the Netherlands.

References

External links
 
 

1985 births
Living people
Chilean footballers
Chile international footballers
Chile under-20 international footballers
Deportes Concepción (Chile) footballers
Lota Schwager footballers
Naval de Talcahuano footballers
Chilean Primera División players
Primera B de Chile players
Association football defenders